The Swiss Footballer of the Year is an annual award given to the best footballer based in Switzerland and the best Swiss national team player.

From the 1972–73 season until the 1997–98 season, the award was chosen by the now defunct Swiss newspaper Sport. Since the original award could only be won by a Swiss national, there was also a Foreigner of the Year award from 1973–74 until 1997–98.

Since 1998, two Player of the Year trophies have been awarded each year; one to the best player in the Swiss Super League known as the Axpo Swiss Super League Player of the Year and one to the best national team player known as the Credit Suisse Player of the Year.

Award winners

Swiss Super League Player of the Year 
Awarded annually to the best player in the Swiss Super League.

Swiss Player of the Year 
Awarded to the best player of the Swiss National Team.

By player

Sport Nationalliga A awards

1975−1998: Foreigner of the Year 
Previously awarded annually to the best foreign player in the Nationalliga A.

1973−1998: Swiss Footballer of the Year 
Previously awarded to the best Swiss player playing in the Swiss Super League.

References

External links 

 Switzerland - Footballer of the Year on RSSSF

Player of the Year
Association football player of the year awards by nationality
Awards established in 1973
Footballer of the Year
1973 establishments in Switzerland
1998 disestablishments in Switzerland
Awards disestablished in 1998
Annual events in Switzerland
Association football player non-biographical articles